Ramon Borrell (972–1017) was count of Barcelona, Girona and Ausona from 992. He was the son of Borrell II of Barcelona and Letgarda of Rouergue, and was associated with his father in ruling the counties from 988.

Biography
Between 1000 and 1002 Ramon had to deal with a number of incursions by Almanzor. However, Almanzor died in 1002, and seeing an opportunity Ramon counter-attacked in 1003 leading an expedition to Lleida. This prompted a new raid on the county of Barcelona by Almanzor's son, Abd al-Malik al-Muzaffar. This was defeated by an alliance of Christian forces at the Battle of Torà. Ramon was also present at the Battle of Albesa shortly thereafter.

In 1010, with the Cordoban Caliphate crumbling into civil war, Ramon saw another opportunity. He organised a campaign, assisted by the bishop of Vic and Sal·la, bishop of Urgell, against the Caliphate with Ermengol I of Urgell and Bernard I of Besalú, and joined forces with Muhammad II of Córdoba. Their army destroyed the forces of Caliph Sulayman II and sacked Córdoba in May 1010, although Ermengol died as a result of the battle. Both Arnulf, of bishop of Vic and Sal·la, bishop of Urgell died on this campaign. On 2 June 1010, Ramon participated in the Battle of Aqbat al-Bakr on the side of the Muslim rebels as part of the Andalusian civil wars.

In 1015 and 1016 Ramon made further expeditions to the rivers Ebro and Segre. The treasure obtained from these campaigns maintained the loyalty of his barons.

Within the County of Barcelona he ensured the repopulation of the Segarra, Conca de Barberà and Camp de Tarragona. He was also the first Catalan ruler to mint his own coinage.

At his death in 1017, he was succeeded by his son Berenguer Ramon under the regency of his mother. He was reportedly buried in the Barcelona Cathedral, but his grave was lost.

Marriage and children
In 991, Ramon married Ermesinde of Carcassonne, with whom he had: 
Borrell Ramon
Berenguer Ramon ( 1006)
Etienette (Stephanie), who married, firstly, Roger I of Tosny, and, secondly, García Sánchez III of Pamplona.

References

Sources

Counts of Barcelona
Burials at Barcelona Cathedral
1017 deaths
972 births
10th-century people from the County of Barcelona
11th-century people from the County of Barcelona